"I Know a Place" is a song with music and lyrics by Tony Hatch. It was recorded in 1965 by Petula Clark at the Pye Studios in Marble Arch in a session which featured drummer Bobby Graham and the Breakaways vocal group.

Released as the follow-up to "Downtown", which it strongly resembles both in musical structure and the story conveyed by the lyrics, "I Know a Place" became Clark's second consecutive Top Ten hit in the United States, remaining on the charts for twelve weeks. 
Five of the twelve weeks on the US charts were spent in the Top Ten, the song's fourth week at No. 9, the fifth & sixth week at No. 4, the seventh week at its peak No. 3, then slipping in its eighth week to No. 6, the ninth week ending its turn in the Top Ten at No. 11. The American recording industry honored her with a Grammy Award for "Best Contemporary (R&R) Vocal Performance of 1965 – Female" for the song.

Its UK success was more moderate with a No. 17 peak, establishing the mid-60s pattern of Clark generally having more hit impact in the US than in her homeland.

Billboard described "I Know a Place" as "another winning performance" from Clark and also praised Tony Hatch's production.

Talking about "I Know a Place", Clark told The Boston Globe in 1966 that "No matter what anyone tells you, to make it in the United States is still the dream of every transatlantic performer. You work for it. Long for it. And I can't tell you how ecstatic I was when 'I Know a Place' was nearly as big a hit as 'Downtown' and the Copacabana Club in New York signed me."

The recording reached No. 1 in Canada and South Africa, No. 3 in Rhodesia, No. 7 in Australia, and No. 10 in India.

"Viens Avec Moi," Clark's French recording of the song, charted in France and Belgium.

Having much more of a rock and roll beat than its predecessor, "I Know a Place" emulated the theme of "Downtown" by inviting the listener to "just get away where your worries won't find you" to a place "where the music is fine and the lights are always low."

The song twice includes the lyric "a cellar full of noise", a deliberate reference to A Cellarful of Noise, the title of Brian Epstein's 1964 autobiography, describing the below-ground Cavern Club in Liverpool where he first discovered the Beatles.

The song is the opening theme for Bill Whittle's weekly podcast, "The Stratosphere Lounge."

The song is featured in the film The Anniversary Party.

The song is featured in a number of episodes of Here's Lucy including "Mod, Mod Lucy".

The song is used as the background music to the 1977 Mike Jittlov animated short Animato.

The song appeared on the CBS soap As the World Turns in 2000, performed by that show's character Barbara Ryan (Colleen Zenk).

The song is used as background music in Season 4, Episode 9 ("The Beautiful Girls) of Mad Men. 

A version of this song, with slightly altered lyrics, was used to promote the Pizza Hut restaurants in Australia during the 1970s.

Julian Cope borrowed the song's chorus for the bridge section of his 1990 remake of "Five O'Clock World".

"I Know a Place" was also recorded by Dick Contino for his 1965 album Dick Contino Plays & Sings the Hits and by Sarah Vaughan for her January 1966 album release Pop Artistry, and also by Sammy Davis Jr (The Sounds of '66) and by Ricky Nelson.

"I Know a Place" has been recorded in medley with Petula Clark's precedent hit "Downtown" by Karen Mason on her 1991 album When the Sun Comes Out as "Downtown"/ "I Know a Place", and also by Ann Hampton Callaway and Liz Callaway on their 2011 album Boom! Live at Birdland as "I Know a Place"/ "Downtown".

The 1967 album release Pet Project by the Bob Florence Big Band features an instrumental version of "I Know a Place", the album being devoted to songs associated with Petula Clark. Vocal group Something Big  also include "I Know a Place" on their 2012 Tony Hatch tribute EP Hatched.

Translated versions of "I Know a Place" include "Znam Jedno Mjesto" (Croatian) by Gabi Novak; "Ik ken een tent" (Dutch) by Jacco van Renesse; "Un bel posto" (Italian) by Gigliola Cinquetti; "Sei de um lugar" (Portuguese) by Trio Esperança; "Znám Jeden Kout" (Slovak) by Helena Blehárová; and "Sé de un lugar" (Spanish) by Melissa.

References

1965 singles
Petula Clark songs
Songs written by Tony Hatch
RPM Top Singles number-one singles
Song recordings produced by Tony Hatch
1965 songs
Pye Records singles
Warner Records singles
Disques Vogue singles